Dr Vinya S Ariyaratne is the General Secretary of Sarvodaya and also a lecturer in Community Medicine Faculty of Medical Sciences University of Sri Jayewardenepura in Sri Lanka. He is a Medical Doctor by profession. He is a son of Dr A. T. Ariyaratne the founder and President of the Sarvodaya Shramadana Movement in Sri Lanka.

Early life and education
Vinya was educated at Nalanda College Colombo. And he received his Doctor of Medicine degree from De La Salle University in Philippines in 1989. Then he received his Master of Public Health degree from Johns Hopkins University in 1990. He was a visiting fellow at Liverpool School of Tropical Medicine in 1992. He holds Master of Science and Doctor of Medicine in Community Medicine from Post graduate institute of Medicine of the University of Colombo, Sri Lanka.

Career
He was a lecturer in community medicine at Faculty, Medicine of University of Sri Jayawardenapura.

Social Movements 
In the year 2000, he became executive director of Sarvodaya Movement. Vinya was also the former Chairman of Deshodaya Development Finance Company Limited (DDFC) which is a micro-finance and enterprise development arm of Sarvodaya. He was the founder of Sarvodaya Institute of Higher Learning.

Politics 
He became active in politics for 2019 Presidential Election by leading National Peoples Movement which was formed by uniting multiple civil organizations including Deshodaya.

See also 
 Deshodaya
 Sarvodaya

References

External links
 Seminar on Poverty Alleviation
 DDFC gets new Chairman
 Our Founder: A.T. Ariyaratne
 Dr. Vinya Ariyaratne on IDP concerns - SLT 34 b
 Dr. Vinya Ariyaratne says Hate has no place in Sri Lanka
 Sarvodaya, Awakening Of All in Sri Lanka - Dr. Vinya Ariyaratne
 Human Rights Commission of Sri Lanka expresses commitment to play role in national reconciliation
 People have spoken, get to work

Sri Lankan Buddhists
Sinhalese physicians
Alumni of Nalanda College, Colombo
Living people
Academic staff of the University of Sri Jayewardenepura
Year of birth missing (living people)
De La Salle University alumni